Bounce, formerly known as Before the Bounce and After the Bounce, is an Australian light entertainment television series focusing on Australian Rules football. The show, currently airing on Fox Footy, takes a comedic look back at the previous week in the Australian Football League. First aired in 2007, the show is currently hosted by former footballers Jason Dunstall and Cameron Mooney and former basketballer Andrew Gaze.

History
Originally called Before the Bounce, the show was broadcast on Friday nights before the opening game of the round. The original hosts were Dunstall, Frawley, journalists Gerard Whateley and Damian Barrett, and former footballer Billy Brownless. In 2011, the show's name changed to After the Bounce and it moved to Sunday nights, normally immediately after the final game of the round. Whateley hosted the show for the final time in 2011, before his other show, AFL 360, was extended to be broadcast four nights per week in 2012 with the launch of the new 24/7 AFL channel Fox Footy. When co-host Damien Fleming left Australia to cover the Australian cricket team's tour of the West Indies in March 2012, he was replaced by Andrew Gaze. For 2014, the show's name was changed again, this time to simply Bounce, and it moved to Wednesday nights at 8.30pm following AFL 360. In 2015, it returned to the Sunday night timeslot following the final game of the round, but retained its title of Bounce. The show also became sponsored by Holden.

Following the 2015 season, Alastair Lynch left the show in order to spend more time with his family. He was due to be replaced by former stand-in presenter Nathan Grima, who had recently announced his retirement from the AFL. However, in February 2016, Grima announced a comeback to football, signing with the Essendon Football Club as a top-up player due to the club's supplements controversy. As such, it was later announced that former footballer Cameron Mooney would join the series, with Barry Hall to also join the series for the 'Yesterday's Heroes' segment. In April 2016, Gaze announced that he would be leaving the show after the show on 24 April 2016 to take up a role as head coach of the Sydney Kings in the National Basketball League. Gaze would remain on the show on a part-time basis, in rotation with other guest panellists including the return of Fleming, former footballers Brian Lake and Robert DiPierdomenico and comedians Julian Schiller and Tegan Higginbotham amongst others. This format would continue in future seasons.

The 350th episode of Bounce aired on 23 June 2019.

On 9 September 2019, Danny Frawley died in a single-car accident. Bounce did not air for the rest of the 2019 season, however a special episode appeared a week later in his memory.

Approaching the 2020 season, it was announced Bounce will return with Dunstall remaining as host, Gaze increasing his presence in the show, with Mooney, Sharni Layton and Bernie Vince resuming their roles as other members on the panel. The Golden Fist Award will be renamed "Spud's Golden Fist" as a continuation of Frawley's legacy.

Hosts

Regular Presenters
 Jason Dunstall (2007–present)
 Cameron Mooney (2016–present)
 Bernie Vince (2019–present)
 Andrew Gaze (2011–2016, 2019–present)
 Ben Dixon (2021–present)

Former presenters
 Danny Frawley (2007–2019)
 Billy Brownless (2007–2008)
 Gerard Whateley (2007–2011)
 Damian Barrett (2007–2009)
 Damien Fleming (2011–2012)
 Andrew Gaze (2011–2016)
 Alastair Lynch (2012–2015)
 Sharni Layton (2018–2020)

Temporary presenters
 Mark Bosnich (2012, 2015, 2016)
 Sam Pang (2014) 
 Nathan Grima (2014) 
 Julian Schiller (2016–17)
 Brian Lake (2016)
 Robert DiPierdomenico (2016) 
 Tegan Higginbotham (2016-2017)
 Merv Hughes (2016)
 Rodney Hogg (2016)
 Simon O'Donnell (2016-2018)
 Brian Lake (2017-2018)

Segments

Current
 Numerology - Cameron Mooney presents numerical or statistical quirks from the previous weekend.
 Golden Fist Award - As a protest against most awards being won by midfielders and forwards, Bernie Vince or Sharni Layton, Previously Danny Frawley shows clips of the week's best spoils, and then gives votes for the best defenders of the week. After Frawley died in a single-car accident on 9 September 2019, a Change.org petition was started to make it an official AFL award; it has, as of 12 September 2019, garnered over 62,000 signatures.
 Clangers - Cameron Mooney selects and discusses ruinous actions committed by players during the games of the latest round. The segment was previously presented by Danny Frawley until his death in 2019 and was previously known as Coach Killers until mid-2015 and Don’t Come Monday until 2020.
 Cut The Crap - Andrew Gaze calls out clichéd press conferences from players or coaches and re-dubs the audio to what he thinks they really should have said. This was previously presented by Danny Frawley until his death in 2019.
 Turn It Up! - A soapbox-like segment in which Andrew Gaze admonishes the words/actions of people from the past week.
 In This Round - Jason Dunstall looks back at some of the highlights of the round that just ended in past seasons. 
 Dicko's Social Life - Dicko shows football and non-football clips from the previous week. 
 Chief's Instagram - The crew berates Jason with supposed pictures and videos from his Instagram: @chief_dunstall 
 Yesterday's Heroes - Andrew Gaze and Bernie Vince compete against Cameron Mooney and Jason Dunstall in non-football sports and activities. Barry Hall and Brian Lake competed until the left the show, and Danny Frawley until his death in 2019. This segment not used in 2020 due to COVID-19 restrictions.
 Dribble File - Jason Dunstall looks at failed dribble kicks from the latest round.
 Bring Your Boots - Cameron Mooney spotlights a player's superior effort and commitment from one of the weekend's games. In later seasons, this has been adapted to feature the best dribble kick of the week, in response to Dunstall's Dribble File.
 Moon's Beef of the Week - Cameron Mooney discusses things that have irritated him throughout the week. This segment was previously presented by Jason Dunstall.
 Please Explain - Jason Dunstall is left baffled by off-field events of the week.
 Top 5 - Jason Dunstall delivers a top 5 relating to one topic.

Golden Fist Award
The winners of the Golden Fist Award are listed below. The annual award is given to the defender that accumulates the most votes from Bernie Vince and Sharni Layton and previously Danny Frawley across the season. The award was sponsored by Cbus from 2013 to 2015 and Mrs Mac's Pies in 2018.

*  McGovern was in 2019 declared the winner, despite Harris Andrews being declared the winner on the final show in 2018.

** Sicily was in front when voting ended after Frawley’s death.

Previous
 What Happens Next? - Alastair Lynch plays an excerpt of archival football game footage, and the other three co-hosts have to guess what will happen in it.
 Lynchy's Time Warp - Alastair Lynch plays tapes from past and present games relating to a single topic.
 Real Bounce Australia - Danny Frawley, Andrew Gaze, Alastair Lynch and Jason Dunstall take you behind the scenes of the program, in a parody of The Real Housewives franchise.
 The Flog Files - Jason Dunstall presents events of the week that demonstrate an admirable commitment to general floggery.

See also

 List of Australian television series
 List of longest-running Australian television series

References

External links
 

Fox Sports (Australian TV network) original programming
Fox Footy original programming
2010s Australian television series
2007 Australian television series debuts
Australian rules football television series
English-language television shows